Mallu Vetti Minor is a 1990 Indian Tamil-language drama film directed by Manobala, produced and written by P. Kalaimani. The film stars Sathyaraj, Seetha and Shobana. It was released on 17 October 1990. The film was remade in Telugu as Minor Raja and in Kannada as Vamshakobba.

Plot 

The story begins with Santhana Lakshmi being released from the jail and remembering her past.

Rassappa Gounder, also known as Mallu Vetti Minor, was a bachelor and rich man who spent his time in the brothels like his father Marappa Gounder. Santhana Lakshmi and Rassappa fell in love with each other. Rassappa Gounder and President were in a feud for several years. In a misunderstanding, Rassappa Gounder had to marry Parimala and married her. A few years later, Rassappa Gounder became the perfect husband and had a son. While Santhana Lakshmi was still unmarried and teased Rassappa Gounder whenever she got the opportunity. One day, that was the straw that broke the camel's back so the angry Rassappa Gounder raped Santhana Lakshmi. The rest of story is what happens to Rassappa Gounder, Parimala and Santhana Lakshmi.

Cast 

Sathyaraj as Rassappa Gounder and Marappa Gounder
Shobana as Santhana Lakshmi
Seetha as Parimala
Vinu Chakravarthy as President
Vennira Aadai Moorthy
Senthil
Chinni Jayanth
Thyagu as Pattabhi
MRK as Paramasivam
Kokila as Pattabhi's wife
Kutty Padmini as Paramasivam's wife
Master Rajesh as Rassappa Gounder's son
T. K. S. Chandran
Idichapuli Selvaraj
Sivaraman as marriage broker
Kanthimathi
S. N. Lakshmi
Bayilvan Ranganathan
Periya Karuppu Thevar
Sakthivel
Thalapathi Dinesh

Soundtrack 
The soundtrack was composed by Ilaiyaraaja, with lyrics written by Pulamaipithan, Gangai Amaran and Piraisoodan. The song "Kaathirundha Malli" is set in Amritavarshini raga, and "Manasukkulle" is set to Harikambhoji.

Release and reception 
Mallu Vetti Minor was released on 17 October 1990, Diwali day. C. R. K. of Kalki called the performances of the lead actors and the music as positive points.

References

External links 
 

1990 drama films
1990 films
1990s Tamil-language films
Films directed by Manobala
Films scored by Ilaiyaraaja
Indian drama films
Tamil films remade in other languages